Alba railway station serves the town and comune of Alba, in the Piedmont region, northwestern Italy.

Services

Railway stations in Piedmont
Railway stations opened in 1864